Cristopher Jesús Barrera Vergara (born 18 April 1998) is a Chilean professional footballer who plays as a right-back for Chilean Primera División side Curicó Unido.

Club career
A product of Deportes Melipilla youth system, he made his professional debut in the win against Deportes Puerto Montt for the 2019 Primera B de Chile. Along with Melipilla, he got the promotion to the Chilean Primera División for the 2021 season. For the 2022 season, he joined Coquimbo Unido in the Chilean Primera División.

He joined curicó Unido for the 2023 season.

Personal life
Barrera is nicknamed El Gringo.

References

External links
 
 
 Cristopher Barrera at PlaymakerStats

1998 births
Living people
Chilean footballers
Association football defenders
Deportes Melipilla footballers
Coquimbo Unido footballers
Curicó Unido footballers
Primera B de Chile players
Chilean Primera División players
Place of birth missing (living people)